Open Humanities Press is an international open access publishing initiative in the humanities, specializing in critical and cultural theory. OHP's editorial board includes scholars like Alain Badiou, Jonathan Culler, Stephen Greenblatt, Jean-Claude Guédon, Graham Harman, J. Hillis Miller, Antonio Negri, Peter Suber and Gayatri Spivak, among others.

From 2010-2015, Open Humanities Press collaborated with the University of Michigan Library's MPublishing branch to fund the production of monographs. Open Humanities Press is currently collaborating in a similar way with the Main Library (University of Illinois Urbana-Champaign).

History
The Open Humanities Press (OHP) is a scholar-led publishing initiative founded by Paul Ashton (Australia), Gary Hall (UK), Sigi Jöttkandt (Australia) and David Ottina (US). Its aim is to raise awareness of open access publishing in the humanities and to provide promotional and technical support to open access journals that have been invited by OHP's editorial oversight group to join the collective.

OHP launched in May 2008 with seven open access journals and was named a "beacon of hope" by the Public Library of Science. In August, 2009 OHP announced it will begin publishing open access book series edited by senior members of OHP's board.

Works

Books
The monograph series are:
New Metaphysics edited by Graham Harman and Bruno Latour
Critical Climate Change edited by Claire Colebrook and Tom Cohen
CCC2 Irreversibility edited by Tom Cohen and Claire Colebrook
Fibreculture Books edited by Andrew Murphie
Liquid Books edited by Gary Hall and Clare Birchall
Immediations edited by the SenseLab
Technographies edited by Steven Connor, David Trotter and James Purdon

Journals

Open Humanities Press also hosts several open access journals, including the following:
 Cosmos and History
 Culture Machine
 International Journal of Žižek Studies
 Vectors: Journal of Culture and Technology in a Dynamic Vernacular

See also

 Open Book Publishers
 Punctum Books
 re.press

References

Further reading
 
 "New Open Access Press Makes its Debut," Jennifer Howard, Chronicle of Higher Education, 7 May, 2008 
 "OA in the Humanities Badlands," Tracy Caldwell, Information World Review, 4 June 2008
 "OA on the Crest of a Wave," Julie Hare, Campus Review 18.26 1 July 2008

External links

Online publishing companies of the United Kingdom
Open access publishers